Medical gas therapy is a treatment involving the administration of various gases. It has been used in medicine since the use of oxygen therapy. Many other gases, collectively known as factitious airs, were explored for medicinal value in the late eighteenth century.

Nitric oxide

Nitric oxide is a gas that is inhaled. It was initially described in 1987 as an "endothelial-derived relaxing factor" and has since been used to treat pulmonary disorders. It works by relaxing smooth muscle to widen (dilate) blood vessels, especially in the lungs.  Nitric oxide is used together with a mechanical ventilator to treat respiratory failure in premature infants.

Helium and oxygen
In medicine, heliox generally refers to a mixture of 21% O2 (the same as air) and 79% He, although other combinations are available.

Heliox generates less airway resistance than air and thereby requires less mechanical energy to ventilate the lungs. "Work of Breathing" (WOB) is reduced. It does this by two mechanisms:
 increased tendency to laminar flow;
 reduced resistance in turbulent flow.
Heliox has a similar viscosity to air but a significantly lower density (0.5 g/L versus 1.2 5g/L at STP). Flow of gas through the airways comprises laminar flow, transitional flow and turbulent flow. The tendency for each type of flow is described by the Reynolds number. Heliox's low density produces a lower Reynolds number and hence higher probability of laminar flow for any given airway. Laminar flow tends to generate less resistance than turbulent flow.

In the small airways where flow is laminar, resistance is proportional to gas viscosity and is not related to density and so heliox has little effect. The Hagen–Poiseuille equation describes laminar resistance. In the large airways where flow is turbulent, resistance is proportional to density, so heliox has a significant effect.

Heliox has been used medically since the early 1930s. It was the mainstay of treatment in acute asthma before the advent of bronchodilators. Currently, heliox is mainly used in conditions of large airway narrowing (upper airway obstruction from tumors or foreign bodies and vocal cord dysfunction). There is also some use of heliox in conditions of the medium airways (croup, asthma and chronic obstructive pulmonary disease).

Patients with these conditions may develop a range of symptoms including dyspnea (breathlessness), hypoxemia (below-normal oxygen content in the arterial blood) and eventually a weakening of the respiratory muscles due to exhaustion, which can lead to respiratory failure and require intubation and mechanical ventilation. Heliox may reduce all these effects, making it easier for the patient to breathe. Heliox has also found utility in the weaning of patients off mechanical ventilation, and in the nebulization of inhalable drugs, particularly for the elderly. Research has also indicated advantages in using helium–oxygen mixtures in delivery of anaesthesia.

References

Respiratory therapy
Pulmonology
Medical treatments
Industrial gases